Edgar V. Cunningham, Sr. (December 11, 1910 – February 27, 1980) was an early youth member of the Boy Scouts of America who, for a number of years, was believed to be the first African American Eagle Scout. Cunningham married Susie Ann Rockett on September 14, 1931, in Galena, Illinois.  They had five children, eighteen grandchildren and seventeen great-grandchildren.

Background
Cunningham was born in New Orleans, Louisiana and was a member of Troop 12 in Waterloo, Iowa in what was then Wapsipinicon Area Council. Troop 12 was a "colored troop" formed in 1925 during the period when Scout units were segregated and, with Troop 9, was one of the two colored troops in Waterloo formed by James Lincoln Page.  Cunningham was the first Scout in either of the Waterloo colored troops to earn Eagle Scout on June 8, 1926.

Cunningham received a hand-written letter from President Calvin Coolidge referring to him as the first black Eagle Scout, and his Scoutmaster, James Lincoln Page, received a presidential citation for guiding Cunningham through that process. After Cunningham died in 1980, the Winnebago Council (the successor to the Wapsipinicon Area Council) made inquiries to the National Council of the BSA to determine if he was indeed the first black Eagle Scout.  Since Cunningham had earned Eagle Scout fourteen years after the first Eagle Scout was awarded and National did not track ethnicity, at that time there was no way to validate the claim.

Recent scholarship has shown that Hamilton Bradley of Rome, New York became an Eagle Scout before 1920, making Bradley the earliest known black Eagle Scout.

See also

Scouting in Iowa
List of Eagle Scouts (Boy Scouts of America)

References

1910 births
1980 deaths
People from Iowa
African-American people